"Stolen Dance" is a song by German duo Milky Chance, released in 2012 in Germany. The single has reached number one in Austria, France, Belgium (Wallonia), Switzerland, Poland, Czech Republic and Hungary, additionally it was the most popular track in Poland in 2014. A 4-track Stolen Dance EP (including the single "Down by the River") was released by Lichtdicht Records and Republic Records on 9 May 2014. The song also placed at number 4 in Triple J's Hottest 100, 2014.

History

Single and music video
After playing two live shows, over two weeks in 2013, the band recorded their debut album in a home-made studio in Rehbein's childhood home. Before finishing and releasing the record, the group released several singles on SoundCloud and on YouTube. In an interview with Edmonton's Sonic 102.9, the band said that it took them three years to write the song "Stolen Dance". An early version of the song, with different production, was uploaded to YouTube on 7 September 2012. The final version of the song was first uploaded to YouTube 4 April 2013 and quickly became a viral hit, racking up millions of views. The magazine SPIN wrote about the video, "the clip for "Stolen Dance" nails the visual for its artist in a way that feels definitive and not overly self-conscious. It's still without being static, evocative while not provocative, silly but never stupid." The video made the band the "most blogged about act" for that month on HypeM. As of May 2022, the video has had over 700 million views on YouTube.

The song was first released on their own label on 5 April 2013 as a single and reached number one in Austria, France, Belgium (Wallonia), Switzerland, Poland, Czech Republic and Hungary.

2014 EPs
With the success in Europe in 2013 and additional touring, the single was made available in a radio edit version and on two different versions of EP under various labels in 2014 in Luxembourg (where it also went to number one), Australia, U.S., Canada, New Zealand, and Ireland.

A 4-track Stolen Dance EP (including the single "Down by the River") was released by Lichtdicht Records and Republic Records on 9 May 2014.

The song charted in countries where it had not yet been released, such as the UK, which did not have a scheduled release date, although it was included on BBC1's "B List" the week of 23 June 2014. In the U.S., iTunes gave the song a release date of 17 June 2014, offering the "Stolen Dance" single (with the original mix) for free.

Critical reception
Spin described the leading single "Stolen Dance" as a "serenely rollicking crossover jam", clarifying that the song "is no red herring — the great majority of Sadnecessary follows in its pattern of low-octane beats and gently lapping guitar strumming, making for a lovely and understated album."

Awards and nominations

Versions

2013
 "Stolen Dance" – 5:11/5:12 (original single release/original mix)
 "Stolen Dance" – 5:15 (album version; original mix on Sadnecessary)

2014
 "Stolen Dance" (radio edit) – 3:23 (featured on the Stolen Dance EP and Deep Sounds: The Very Best of Deep House
 "Stolen Dance" (Radio Edit FlicFlac Mix) – 3:35 (featured on the Stolen Dance EP, Club House 2014 – Holiday Summerhits and Essential Clubhouse – The Summer Collection 2014 (Mixed by Mark Bale))
 "Stolen Dance" (2014 Club Edit FlicFlac Mix) – 6:05 (featured on the Stolen Dance EP)
 "Stolen Dance" (New Club Edit FlicFlac) – 6:02 (featured on Deep House Hits, Vol. 1)

Charts

Weekly charts

Year-end charts

Certifications

Release history

Notes

A  The single was first made available on iTunes in various countries with unrestricted access including Kenya, Zimbabwe, and South Africa.

References

External links
 
 Milky Chance "Stolen Dance" Lyrics

2012 songs
2013 debut singles
Milky Chance songs
English-language German songs
Number-one singles in Austria
SNEP Top Singles number-one singles
Number-one singles in Poland
Number-one singles in Switzerland
Irish Singles Chart number-one singles
Ultratop 50 Singles (Wallonia) number-one singles
Songs about dancing